The International Institute of Rehabilitation Sciences and Research (IIRS, Bhubaneswar) is managed by ASTHA Trust, founded by Mrs.Bishnupriya Mishra . The campus is located at KHANDAGIRI, in Bhubaneswar, Orissa, India. The institution provides 3yeae +10 month  degree course called BASLP.

The Bachelor in Audiology and Speech Language Pathology (BASLP) course is a rehabilitative professional course standardized by the Rehabilitation Council of India. BASLP professionals (audiologist and speech language therapist) deal with persons with hearing and speech language problems. These professionals assess the existence of problem, severity, and type of problem as well as provide qualitative intervention to the persons with disabilities.

Their services includes assessing hearing impairment (type and degree of hearing loss with possible site of lesion), applying different audiological tests, assessment of speech, and language problem (type and severity). Besides assessment the professionals also give qualitative intervention to the patients to combat with the problem.

Course description
The program consist of professional and academic component which leads to registration as an Audiologist by Rehabilitation Council of India. The program provides four year full-time study with 3 years institutional academic exposure and clinical exposure, and one full year of clinical placement and supervision that supports placement. During the three year degree period, students get knowledge in the below listed subjects:

Audiology
Linguistics
Communication disorders
Speech disorders
Language disorders
Voice disorders
Anatomy(related to ENT)
Physiology(Related to ENT)
Pathology(related to ENT)
Aural rehabilitation
Pediatrics
Neurology
Electronics
Computer application
Clinical Psychology

Departments

Audiology department
The department deals in academic and clinical activity such as assessment/ diagnosis, management, treatment, habilitation, rehabilitation, special education for hearing impaired, organising hearing check-up camps, early identification programs, awareness programs, etc.

Speech department
The department deals in both the academic and clinical activity such as assessment/ diagnosis, management, treatment of communication related problems, special education, recreation therapy, preschool facility for disabled, early identification programs, clinical conference, awareness programs, etc.

Psychology department
Provides both academic and psychological diagnosis of some speech problems, psychological assistance to clients and family members and links with community based rehabilitation.

See also
Utkal University
American Speech-Language-Hearing Association (ASHA)

External links
http://www.iirs.ac.in

Rehabilitation medicine organisations based in India